The Lausanne Conference was a 1932 meeting of representatives from the United Kingdom, Germany, and France that resulted in an agreement to suspend World War I reparations payments imposed on Germany by the Treaty of Versailles. Held from June 16 to July 9, 1932, it was named for its location in Lausanne, Switzerland.

The Hoover Moratorium had placed a hold on war reparations payments in 1931, and a year later the delegates to the Lausanne Conference realized that the deepening world financial crisis in the Great Depression made it nearly impossible for Germany to resume its payments. However, Britain and France and other Allies had borrowed heavily to fight the war, and in particular, France and Belgium were struggling after having had their infrastructure severely damaged by the fighting and by the deliberate destruction and plundering from retreating German forces as the war drew to a close. Therefore, the delegates came to an informal understanding that the permanent elimination of Germany's debt and war reparations would be subject to reaching an agreement with the United States concerning their outstanding war debts.

In December 1932, the U.S. Congress rejected the Allied war debt reduction plan, which technically meant that the war reparations and debt reverted to the debt reduction previously granted Germany by the 1929 Young Plan. However, the system had collapsed, and Germany made no further payments. By 1933, Germany had made World War I reparations of only one-eighth of the sum required under the Treaty of Versailles.

See also

World War I reparations
Lausanne Conference of 1922–23

References
u-s-history.com
World History at KMLA
1932 chronology

Aftermath of World War I in France
Politics of the Weimar Republic
Great Depression
History of the foreign relations of the United States
Aftermath of World War I in the United Kingdom
World War I conferences
1932 in France
Treaty of Versailles
Lausanne
20th-century diplomatic conferences
1932 in international relations
1932 in Switzerland
Reparations
1932 conferences
1932 in economics